Meleh-ye Hasan Boqeh (also Romanized as Meleh-ye Ḩasan Boq‘eh) is a village in Howmeh Rural District, in the Central District of Harsin County, Kermanshah Province, Iran. At the 2006 census, its population was 100, in 24 families.

References 

Populated places in Harsin County